Benno Elkan OBE (2 December 1877, Dortmund, Westphalia - 10 January 1960, London) was a German-born British sculptor and medallist. His work includes the big Menora standing in front of the Knesset in Jerusalem and also numerous monuments, busts and medals in Germany and England.

Biography
Benno Elkan was born in Dortmund, Germany. He fled Germany in 1933 after the rise of the Nazis. He was married to Hedwig Einstein, sister of Carl Einstein and a concert pianist in her own right. Together they had two children:  Ursula and Wolf, both of whom emigrated to the United States.

Elkan died in London. He is buried at the Liberal Jewish Cemetery, Willesden, England.

Education 

 Gymnasium, Dortmund
 Château du Rosey, Rolle, nr Lausanne
 Royal Academy, Munich and Karlsruhe i/B as painter
 Self-trained as sculptor

Sculpting career 
He studied and worked in Paris, Rome and Frankfurt am Main, and moved to London following the rise of the Nazis in Germany in 1933. His works included tombs, busts, medals and monuments. He was an exhibitor in International Exhibitions in Germany, France, Italy, and England; his works are in many museums in Europe.

Elkan created the first statue in Britain of Sir Walter Raleigh, and designed Frankfurt's Great War Memorial, incorporating mourning mothers as a symbol of loss in World War I. The memorial was removed by the Nazis in 1933 and re-erected in 1946.

Some major works 

 "Freedom Monument", Mainz (destroyed 1940)
 The first statue in Britain of Sir Walter Raleigh, now at Greenwich
 Orangutan group (in lead) "A Jungle Family", Edinburgh Zoo (created for the Empire Exhibition in Glasgow)
 Mowgli's Jungle Friends, plaque in lead on Rudyard Kipling Memorial Building, Windsor
 Bronze candelabra with Biblical figures at King's College Chapel, Cambridge, New College, Oxford and Buckfast Abbey. The two bronze candelabra at Buckfast Abbey are each side of the Sanctuary. One represents the four cardinal virtues of prudence, justice, temperance and fortitude. The other shows the four great prophets of the Old Testament, Isaiah, Jeremiah, Ezechiel and Daniel, who are portrayed with human expressions of hope, lament, frenzy and sophistication. 
 Two Great Bronze Candelabra of the Old and New Testament with about 80 figures erected in Westminster Abbey
 Tomb for Abbot Anscar Vonier in Buckfast Abbey
 Great War Memorial, To the Victims, Symbol of All Mourning Mothers in Frankfurt (removed by the Nazis in 1933, re-erected 1946)
 Fighting Cock life size in silver gilt commissioned by Arsenal Football Club and presented to Tottenham Hotspur FC in 1950 as a gesture of friendship, for allowing them to use their ground during World War 2. A photograph of Benno Elkan with the statue appeared in the Tottenham Hotspur Matchday Programme on Sunday March 16, 2014. The current whereabouts of this piece is unknown. 
 Seven-branched Candelabrum (Menorah) for the Knesset in Jerusalem (a gift of British parliamentary members and others)

References

External links
 https://sites.google.com/site/bennoelkan/
 http://www.glasgowsculpture.com/pg_biography.php?sub=elkan_b#

1877 births
1960 deaths
Alumni of Institut Le Rosey
Jewish artists
Jewish emigrants from Nazi Germany to the United Kingdom
Artists from Dortmund
Burials at Liberal Jewish Cemetery, Willesden